Neopostega is a genus of moths of the family Opostegidae.

Species
Neopostega asymmetra D.R. Davis & J.R. Stonis, 2007
Neopostega distola D.R. Davis & J.R. Stonis, 2007
Neopostega falcata D.R. Davis & J.R. Stonis, 2007
Neopostega longispina D.R. Davis & J.R. Stonis, 2007
Neopostega petila D.R. Davis & J.R. Stonis, 2007

External links
A Revision of the New World Plant-Mining Moths of the Family Opostegidae (Lepidoptera: Nepticuloidea)
Contribution to the Opostegidae Fauna of Central America, with an Updated Checklist and Description of New Species from Costa Rica and Mexico (Insecta: Lepidoptera)

Opostegidae
Monotrysia genera